Dmitriyev, also known as Dmitriyev-Lgovsky, is a town and the administrative center of Dmitriyevsky District of Kursk Oblast, Russia, located on the Svapa River (Dnieper's basin), on the Moscow–Kyiv highway,  northwest of Kursk, the administrative center of the oblast. Population:

Coat of Arms 
Dmitriev's Coat of Arms was confirmed and took into force on 8 January 1780. The author of the symbol is the president of the heraldic office Volkov. The Coat of Arms is visually attractive and has a lot of symbolic meaning related to Dmitriev's history and beautiful nature.

On the top of the symbol, you can see Coat of Arms of Kursk, showing administrative belongings of the town. The bottom symbolises Dmitriev's geographical position on hills. The town is located on five hills which you can see on the municipal arms.

During the heraldic reform in 1860, it was an attempt to change the Dmitriev Coat of Arms. Proposed changes were submitted by B.Kene. The idea was to change the symbol completely. Kene proposed the symbol shown a gold pear on the green shield with a small Coat of Arms of Kursk in the left upper corner. The shield was surrounded by golden leaves and linked with Alexander's tape. The symbol was crowned with bricks crown.

However, proposed changes were not confirmed and took into force and Dmitriev's official symbol still the same.

History
During World War II, Dmitriyev was occupied by German troops from October 8, 1941 to March 2, 1943.

Administrative and municipal status
Within the framework of administrative divisions, Dmitriyev serves as the administrative center of Dmitriyevsky District. As an administrative division, it is incorporated within Dmitriyevsky District as the town of district significance of Dmitriyev. As a municipal division, the town of district significance of Dmitriyev is incorporated within Dmitriyevsky Municipal District as Dmitriyev Urban Settlement.

References

Notes

Sources

External links

Official website of Dmitriyev 
Dmitriyev Business Directory 

Cities and towns in Kursk Oblast
Dmitriyevsky Uyezd